Roughlee Booth is a civil parish in Pendle, Lancashire, England. It contains nine listed buildings that are recorded in the National Heritage List for England.  All of the listed buildings are designated at Grade II, the lowest of the three grades, which is applied to "buildings of national importance and special interest".  Apart from the village of Roughlee, the parish is entirely rural.  All the listed buildings are houses, farmhouses, and farm buildings.

Buildings

References

Citations

Sources

Lists of listed buildings in Lancashire
Buildings and structures in the Borough of Pendle